Sibak (also Romanized as Sībak) is a village in Cheshmeh Langan Rural District, in the Central District of Fereydunshahr County, Isfahan Province, Iran. At the 2006 census, its population was 1,394, in 329 families.

References 

Populated places in Fereydunshahr County